Lake Kitezh is a lake  long near the center of Fildes Peninsula, King George Island, in the South Shetland Islands. The largest of many lakes on the peninsula, it has been used as a reservoir by the Soviet Antarctic Expedition Bellingshausen Station and the Chilean Rodolfo Marsh Station. The name is adapted from the Russian "Ozero Kitezh" used in a 1973 geographical report by L.S. Govorukha and I.M. Simonov. The lake is named after Kitezh, an ancient Russian city of legendary fame.

References

Lakes of Antarctica